Conserved oligomeric Golgi complex subunit 2 is a protein that in humans is encoded by the COG2 gene.
Multiprotein complexes are key determinants of Golgi apparatus structure and its capacity for intracellular transport and glycoprotein modification. Several complexes have been identified, including the Golgi transport complex (GTC), the LDLC complex, which is involved in glycosylation reactions, and the SEC34 complex, which is involved in vesicular transport. These 3 complexes are identical and have been termed the conserved oligomeric Golgi (COG) complex, which includes COG2 (Ungar et al., 2002).

Model organisms

Model organisms have been used in the study of COG2 function. A conditional knockout mouse line, called Cog2tm1a(KOMP)Wtsi was generated as part of the International Knockout Mouse Consortium program — a high-throughput mutagenesis project to generate and distribute animal models of disease to interested scientists.

Male and female animals underwent a standardized phenotypic screen to determine the effects of deletion. Twenty five were carried out on mutant mice and one significant abnormality was observed: no homozygous mutant mice survived until weaning. The remaining tests were carried out on heterozygous mutant adult mice; no additional significant abnormalities were observed in these animals.

Interactions
COG2 has been shown to interact with COG4 and COG3.

References

External links

Further reading

Genes mutated in mice